The 1922 VMI Keydets football team was an American football team that represented the Virginia Military Institute (VMI) during the 1922 college football season as an independent. In their third year under head coach Blandy Clarkson, the team compiled an overall record of 7–2.

Schedule

References

VMI
VMI Keydets football seasons
VMI Keydets football